HD 25291, also known as HR 1242, is a solitary, yellowish-white hued star located in the northern circumpolar constellation Camelopardalis. It has an apparent magnitude of 5.12, making it one of the brighter members of this generally faint constellation.

HD 25291 has a general stellar classification of F0 II, which indicates that it is an evolved early F-type bright giant. It has also been given a class of F2 Ia, instead suggesting a slightly cooler and more luminous supergiant. Nevertheless, it has 8.8 times the mass of the Sun but at an age of 32 million years, it has expanded to 50.1 times its girth. HD 25291 is slightly metal deficient, with an iron abundance 85% of solar levels.

Tetzlaff et al.

References 

025291
1242
Camelopardalis (constellation)
019018
Durchmusterung objects
F-type bright giants